Always Wrong may refer to:

"Always Wrong", song by Neurotic Outsiders
"Always Wrong", song from Eisley discography
"Always Wrong", song by S-X (producer)